Thicket Portage is a community in northern Manitoba located on the Hudson Bay Railway. The community receives passenger rail service at the Thicket Portage railway station.  The community has no all-weather road access. The community is serviced by year round train access, local airport, and winter ice roads. In the summer, it is accessible by boat/vehicle.

Demographics 

References 

Designated places in Manitoba
Mining communities in Manitoba
Northern communities in Manitoba
Unincorporated communities in Northern Region, Manitoba